Hyder Ally (or Hyder Alley) was a merchant ship launched in the United States in 1815. She came to the United Kingdom in 1816. In 1817 she rescued the crew of another vessel. She was wrecked in 1821.

Career
Hyder Alley arrived in Falmouth in October 1816. She sailed from Gravesend, Kent on 3 December, bound for New York.

Hyder Ally first appeared in the volume of Lloyd's Register (LR) for 1816.

On 27 February 1817, the crew of William, of Hull, Baker, master, abandoned their vessel in the Atlantic as being leaky, much damaged, and in want of provisions; she had left Hull on 28 November, bound for New York. Hyder Alley, also New York-bound, took off the crew. However, eight men from Hyder Alley, Howe, master, volunteered to try to bring William in to a port. William, with her crew from Hyder Alley, arrived at Newport, Rhode Island on 10 March.

Fate
A  gale at Cork on 28 December 1821 drove Hyder Ally (a hulk) on shore, doing much damage.

Notes

Citations

1815 ships
Age of Sail merchant ships
Maritime incidents in 1817
Maritime incidents in December 1821